Hamilton Lavity Stoutt (7 March 1929 – 14 May 1995) was a British Virgin Islander politician and the first and longest serving Chief Minister of the British Virgin Islands. He won five general elections (1967, 1979, 1986, 1991 and 1995) and serving three non-consecutive terms of office from 1967 to 1971, again from 1979 to 1983 and again from 1986 until his death in 1995.

Biography

Early life
Stoutt was born on 7 March 1929 in Long Bay, Tortola.  He was the eighth child of Isaiah and Iallia Stoutt.  He married Hilda E. Stoutt in 1956 and had three sons and three daughters.  He was a staunch Methodist, and served as both a Sunday school superintendent and a lay preacher.

Career
Stoutt served as a parliamentarian in the Legislative Council from 1957 until 1967 prior to the adoption of the 1967 constitution,  and at the time of his death was thought to be the longest serving Parliamentarian in the Caribbean. He was a founder of and the leader of the United Party, but after splitting from the party in 1971 went on to found the Virgin Islands Party.

Since Stoutt's death in 1995, a public holiday in the British Virgin Islands has been declared annually on the first Monday in the month of March in memory of his birthday.

The H. Lavity Stoutt Community College in Tortola bears his name.  Stoutt himself left school after his primary school education, and obituary writers have suggested that it was his own lack of a formal education which so strongly inspired him to create and promote opportunities for BVIslanders to further their own educations.

During his lifetime, Lavity Stoutt was extremely fond of the quote from Proverbs 29:18 — "Where there is no vision, the people perish", a phrase he would recite frequently when arguing in favour of development projects.

Electoral history

Lavity Stoutt's percentage of the votes in the 1990 general election remain records for a district seat in the British Virgin Islands (the margin of victory was a record at the time, but has since been surpassed).  Stoutt's 11 electoral victories are also a record.  Stoutt's 38 years as a parliamentarian was a record, but was surpassed by Ralph O'Neal in late 2013.

Political offices

Footnotes

1929 births
1995 deaths
British Virgin Islands Methodists
British Virgin Islands politicians
Chief Ministers of the British Virgin Islands
Leaders of the Opposition (British Virgin Islands)
United Party (British Virgin Islands) politicians
Virgin Islands Party politicians